Kevin Bizier (born 12 August 1984) is a Canadian professional boxer who has challenged once for the IBF welterweight title, in 2016.

Amateur career 

His amateur performance allowed him to become the Fighting pride of Quebec City. Bizier was 7-time Canadian champion during his amateur career. He also represented Canada on the world stage as a member of the national team. He has participated in several tournaments 2007 world championships in Chicago, the 2006 Commonwealth Games in Australia and the 2005 world championship in Mianyang. In the amateur he participated in a total of 124 fights with 98 wins.

His greatest achievement among amateurs is a victory over the gold medalist of the 2008 Summer Olympics, the Dominican Felix Diaz, during the tournament Copa Romana, Dominican Republic in 2006. Among the high-level boxers he faced include Breidis Prescott, Serik Sapiyev and Marcos Maidana.

Professional career 

Bizier happened professionally in 2008 with Groupe Yvon Michel (GYM) of Montreal, Quebec. In his twentieth fight Bizier defeated former world champion Nate Campbell, so to get hold of his IBF Inter-Continental welterweight Champion. In addition, having been champion NABA Welterweight from 2011 to 2013.

Bizier vs. Dan 

The first fight between Bizier  and Jo Jo Dan was a war in which both boxers was completely exhausted after the 8th round. At the end of the battle, the judges issued a controversial split decision in favor of Dan.

Bizier vs. Dan 2 

In October 2014, the IBF ordered an eliminator rematch to become mandatory challenger for the welterweight world title held by Kell Brook.

Professional boxing record

|-
| style="text-align:center;" colspan="8"|25 wins (16 knockouts), 3 losses, 0 draws, 0 no contests 
|-  style="text-align:center; background:#e3e3e3;"
|  style="border-style:none none solid solid; "|Res.
|  style="border-style:none none solid solid; "|Record
|  style="border-style:none none solid solid; "|Opponent
|  style="border-style:none none solid solid; "|Type
|  style="border-style:none none solid solid; "|Round
|  style="border-style:none none solid solid; "|Date
|  style="border-style:none none solid solid; "|Location
|  style="border-style:none none solid solid; "|Notes
|-
|- align=center
|Loss
|25-3
|align=left| Kell Brook
|TKO
|2 (12) ||2016-03-26
|align=left| Sheffield Arena, Sheffield, England
|align=left|For IBF welterweight title.
|-
|- style="text-align:center;"
|Win
|25-2 
|align=left| Fredrick Lawson
|RTD || 10 (12) ||2015-11-07
|align=left| Miccosukee Indian Gaming Resort, Miami, Florida
|align=left|
|- style="text-align:center;"
|Win
|24-2 
|align=left| Fouad El Massoudi
|MD || 8 ||2015-04-04
|align=left| Colisée Pepsi, Quebec City, Quebec
|align=left|
|- style="text-align:center;"
|Loss 
|23-2 
|align=left| Jo Jo Dan 
|SD || 12 ||2014-12-19
|align=left| Colisée Pepsi, Quebec City, Quebec
|align=left|
|- style="text-align:center;"
|Win
|23-1 
|align=left| Laszlo Fazekas
|TKO || 1 (8) ||2014-09-27
|align=left| Bell Centre, Montreal, Quebec
|align=left|
|- style="text-align:center;"
|Win
|22-1 
|align=left| Carlos Leonardo Herrera 
|TKO || 2 (8) ||2014-05-24
|align=left| Bell Centre, Montreal, Quebec
|align=left|
|- style="text-align:center;"
|Loss 
|21-1 
|align=left| Jo Jo Dan  
|SD || 12 ||2013-11-30
|align=left| Colisée Pepsi, Quebec City, Quebec
|align=left|Lost IBF Inter-Continental and NABA welterweight titles.
|- style="text-align:center;"
|Win
|21-0 
|align=left| Giuseppe Lauri
|UD || 6 ||2013-09-28
|align=left| Bell Centre, Montreal, Quebec
|align=left|
|- style="text-align:center;"
|Win
|20-0 
|align=left| Nate Campbell 
|RTD || 8 (12) ||2013-02-08
|align=left| Bell Centre, Montreal, Quebec
|align=left|Won vacant IBF Inter-Continental and NABA welterweight titles.
|- style="text-align:center;"
|Win
|19-0 
|align=left| Doel Carrasquillo
|UD || 8  ||2012-12-14
|align=left| Bell Centre, Montreal, Quebec
|align=left|
|- style="text-align:center;"
|Win
|18-0 
|align=left| Patryk Litkiewicz 
|KO || 1 (6)  ||2012-10-12
|align=left| Bell Centre, Montreal, Quebec
|align=left|
|- style="text-align:center;"
|Win
|17-0 
|align=left| Lanardo Tyner  
|UD || 12 ||2011-12-17
|align=left| Colisée Pepsi, Quebec City, Quebec
|align=left|Won vacant NABA welterweight title.
|- style="text-align:center;"
|Win
|16-0 
|align=left| Christian Bladt
|KO || 3 (8) ||2011-11-05
|align=left| Colisée Pepsi, Quebec City, Quebec
|align=left|
|- style="text-align:center;"
|Win
|15-0 
|align=left| Mauro Lucero
|KO || 5 (8) ||2011-05-21
|align=left| Bell Centre, Montreal, Quebec
|align=left|
|- style="text-align:center;"
|Win
|14-0 
|align=left| Edgar Ruiz
|KO || 1 (8) ||2011-02-11
|align=left| Bell Centre, Montreal, Quebec
|align=left|
|- style="text-align:center;"
|Win
|13-0 
|align=left| Ronnie Warrior Jr 
|RTD || 3 (8) ||2010-12-18
|align=left| Colisée Pepsi, Quebec City, Quebec
|align=left|
|- style="text-align:center;"
|Win
|12-0 
|align=left| Leonardo Rojas
|RTD || 3 (8) ||2010-08-28
|align=left| Metropolis, Montreal, Quebec
|align=left|
|- style="text-align:center;"
|Win
|11-0 
|align=left| Jhonny Navarrete
|RTD || 7 (8) ||2010-06-11
|align=left| Uniprix Stadium, Montreal, Quebec
|align=left|
|- style="text-align:center;"
|Win
|10-0 
|align=left| Wilfredo Negron
|UD || 8 ||2010-04-03
|align=left| Montreal Casino, Montreal, Quebec
|align=left|
|- style="text-align:center;"
|Win
|9-0 
|align=left| Noel Cortez
|KO || 1 (8) ||2010-03-06
|align=left| Montreal Casino, Montreal, Quebec
|align=left|
|- style="text-align:center;"
|Win
|8-0 
|align=left| Michael Springer 
|KO || 1 (6) ||2010-02-06
|align=left| Montreal Casino, Montreal, Quebec
|align=left|
|- style="text-align:center;"
|Win
|7-0 
|align=left| Patrick Cape
|TKO || 1 (6) ||2009-11-28
|align=left| Colisée Pepsi, Quebec City, Quebec
|align=left|
|- style="text-align:center;"
|Win
|6-0 
|align=left| Jose Leonardo Corona
|UD || 6 ||2009-09-25
|align=left| Bell Centre, Montreal, Quebec
|align=left|
|- style="text-align:center;"
|Win
|5-0 
|align=left| Cesar Soriano
|UD || 4 ||2009-06-19
|align=left| Bell Centre, Montreal, Quebec
|align=left|
|- style="text-align:center;"
|Win
|4-0 
|align=left| Ulises Duarte
|KO || 1 (4) ||2009-04-18
|align=left| Montreal Casino, Montreal, Quebec
|align=left|
|- style="text-align:center;"
|Win
|3-0 
|align=left| Travis Hartman
|KO || 2 (4) ||2008-11-29
|align=left| Montreal Casino, Montreal, Quebec
|align=left|
|- style="text-align:center;"
|Win
|2-0 
|align=left| Cesar Figueroa
|UD || 4 ||2008-11-01
|align=left| Montreal Casino, Montreal, Quebec
|align=left|
|- style="text-align:center;"
|Win
|1-0 
|align=left| Jason McClure
|TKO || 1 (4) ||2008-10-04
|align=left| Montreal Casino, Montreal, Quebec
|align=left|
|- style="text-align:center;"

References

External links

Kevin Bizier's Amateur Record

1984 births
Living people
Sportspeople from Quebec City
Welterweight boxers
Canadian male boxers
Boxers at the 2006 Commonwealth Games
Commonwealth Games competitors for Canada